Ítalo/Ytalo Perea Castillo (born June 10, 1993, in Esmeraldas ) is an Ecuadorian boxer who sensationally won the Panamerican Games 2011 Super Heavyweight title at the age of 18.
He is a lefthander but fights from an orthodox stance behind a tight guard.

In 2009 he controversially lost the 81 kg final of the World Junior (f. Cadet) Championships in Armenia to Uzbek Kharzanov.

In 2010 he won the 81 kg PanAm Junior title.

In 2011 he moved up two classes to Super Heavy where he benefitted from the absence of Cuban top favorite Erislandy Savon and won the senior PanAm title by KOing Gerardo Bisbal and outpointing Juan Hiracheta.

In 2012 he KOd Simon Kean (CAN) and beat Dominic Breazeale to qualify for the Olympics
In London he ran right into defending champion Roberto Cammarelle and lost 10:18.

References 

1993 births
Living people
Heavyweight boxers
Boxers at the 2011 Pan American Games
Boxers at the 2012 Summer Olympics
Olympic boxers of Ecuador
Ecuadorian male boxers
Pan American Games gold medalists for Ecuador
Pan American Games medalists in boxing
Medalists at the 2011 Pan American Games
21st-century Ecuadorian people